Mary King may refer to:

People
Mary King (political scientist), professor at the University of Peace, author and non-violence activist (a.k.a. Mary E. King and Mary Elizabeth King)
 Mary King (equestrian), British equestrian and three-time Olympic medallist
 Mary King (economist), Trinidad and Tobago economist and senator
 Mary King (merchant), Scottish merchant, and also a burgess, had a close named after her in Edinburgh
 Mary King (teacher) (1884–1967), New Zealand teacher, principal, businesswoman and political activist
 Mary Lou King, American environmental activist, educator, and writer
 Mary King, the white bride of African-American professor William G. Allen (1853)

Other
 Mary King's Close, street in Edinburgh, Scotland